The 2008–09 Greek Football Cup was the 67th edition of the Greek Football Cup. The competition started on 30 August 2008 with the First Round and concluded on 2 May 2009 with the Final, held at Olympic Stadium.

Olympiacos claimed that season's Greek Cup with a 15–14 victory on penalties over AEK Athens after a 4–4 draw.

Calendar

Knockout phase
Each tie in the knockout phase, apart from the quarter-finals and the semi-finals, was played by a single match. If the score was level at the end of normal time, extra time was played, followed by a penalty shoot-out if the score was still level. In the quarter-finals and the semi-finals were played over two legs, with each team playing one leg at home. The team that scored more goals on aggregate over the two legs advanced to the next round. If the aggregate score was level, the away goals rule was applied, i.e. the team that scored more goals away from home over the two legs advanced. If away goals were also equal, then extra time was played. The away goals rule was again applied after extra time, i.e. if there were goals scored during extra time and the aggregate score was still level, the visiting team advanced by virtue of more away goals scored. If no goals were scored during extra time, the winners were decided by a penalty shoot-out. In the round of 16, if the score was level at the end of normal time the two-legged rule was applied.The mechanism of the draws for each round is as follows:
In the draw for the second round, the teams from the second division are seeded and the winners from the first round were unseeded. The seeded teams are drawn against the unseeded teams.
In the draw for the Round of 32 onwards, the teams from the first division are seeded and the winners from the previous rounds were unseeded. The seeded teams are drawn against the unseeded teams.
In the draws for the Round of 16 onwards, there are no seedings and teams from the different group can be drawn against each other.

First round
The draw took place on 18 August 2008.

Summary

|-
|colspan="3" style="background-color:#D0D0D0" align=center|30 August 2008

|-
|colspan="3" style="background-color:#D0D0D0" align=center|31 August 2008

|}

Matches

Second round
The draw took place on 18 August 2008, after the First Round draw.

Summary

|-
|colspan="3" style="background-color:#D0D0D0" align=center|16 September 2008

|-
|colspan="3" style="background-color:#D0D0D0" align=center|17 September 2008

|-
|colspan="3" style="background-color:#D0D0D0" align=center|18 September 2008

|}

Matches

Additional round

Summary

|}

Matches

Bracket

Round of 32
The draw took place on 18 August 2008.

Summary

|}

Matches

Round of 16
The draw took place on 19 November 2008.

Summary

||colspan="2" 

||colspan="2" rowspan="2" 

||colspan="2" rowspan="3" 

|}

Matches

Replay

Quarter–finals
The draw took place on 26 January 2009.

Summary

|}

Matches

Olympiacos won 2–1 on aggregate.

AEK Athens won on away goals.

Asteras Tripolis won 2–0 on aggregate.

Panserraikos won 3–2 on aggregate.

Semi-finals
The draw took place on 26 January 2009, after the quarter-final draw.

Summary

|}

Matches

AEK Athens won 3–1 on aggregate.

Olympiacos won 4–3 on aggregate.

Final

Top scorers

References

External links
  Greek Cup 2008-2009 at Hellenic Football Federation's official site

Greek Football Cup seasons
Cup
Greek Cup, 2008-09